Oh Yeon-ho (born 18 September 1964) is the founder of "citizen journalism" in South Korea, and CEO of OhmyNews a new approach to cyber-journalism in which ordinary citizens can contribute to a major news organization through being at news events, filing reports, and having their work verified and edited by trained news staff. He is seen as one of the pivotal figures in the contemporary culture of South Korea.

Biography
Oh was born in 1964 in Gokseong. He graduated from Yonsei University in 1988 with a degree in Korean literature. He earned a master's degree in journalism from Regent University in 1998 and has a PhD in mass-communication at Sogang University in Seoul.  In 2006, he received the Wharton Infosys Business Transformation Award for his work with information technology, most specifically his pioneering development of OhmyNews and the society-transforming contributions that resulted.

Media career 
 1988–1999 Reporter, Chief Reporter in Monthly magazine Mahl
 1995–1997 Correspondent in Washington, DC in Monthly magazine Mahl
 22 Feb 2000 Founded OhmyNews, served as CEO and managing editor
 2007–2009 President of Korea Internet Newspaper Association

Awards 
 May 2001 Awarded: The Media Grand Prize of This Year
 October 2001 Selection: 55 people of South Korea
 December 2001 Winning the Grand prize: Democratic Press Award
 October 2004 Winning the Grand prize: Ahn Jong-Pil Press Award
 January 2006 Awarded: Management Innovation
 October 2007 Awarded: Medal of Missouri University
 October 2018 Awarded: Grundtvig Prize 2018
 Ranked 16th in 'This year's 50s for IT characters' as UK Information Technology site (www.silicon.com)

See also
 Citizen journalism
 Independent Media Center
 Ohmynews

References

External links
 OhmyNews official site
 http://english.ohmynews.com/articleview/article_view.asp?no=153109&rel_no=1
 http://news.bbc.co.uk/2/hi/asia-pacific/2843651.stm
 https://web.archive.org/web/20051125021916/http://www.changemakers.net/library/temp/nytimes030603.cfm
 https://web.archive.org/web/20050309193948/http://www.atimes.com.by-parakeet.gibeo.net/atimes/Korea/FK25Dg01.html
 http://www.wacc.org.uk/wacc/publications/media_action/253_oct_2003/ohmynews_anyone_can_be_a_reporter
 Howard W. French "Online Newspaper Shakes Up Korean Politics" New York Times, March 6, 2003
 http://creativeink.blogspot.com/2004/12/citizen-journalists.html
 http://www.editorsweblog.org/2004/05/every_citizen_i.html

1964 births
Living people
South Korean businesspeople
South Korean journalists
Regent University alumni
Sogang University alumni
Yonsei University alumni